Laz is a village in the municipality of Nikšić, Montenegro.

Demographics
According to the 2011 census, its population was 135.

References

Geographic Names Server database entry for Laz, Montenegro

Populated places in Nikšić Municipality